The Type 055 destroyer (NATO/OSD Renhai-class cruiser) is a class of stealth guided-missile destroyers (guided-missile cruisers per NATO/OSD standard) being constructed for the Chinese People's Liberation Army Navy. It is a multi-mission design; the combination of sensors and weapons suggests a main role of area air defence, with anti-submarine warfare capabilities surpassing previous Chinese surface combatants.

The Type 055 is expected to undertake expeditionary missions and form the primary escort for Chinese aircraft carriers.

The United States classifies these ships as cruisers.

Development
The People's Liberation Army Navy was interested in a large destroyer from as early as the late-1960s. A development program, code-named "055", initiated in 1976 was cancelled in 1983 after encountering insurmountable technical obstacles from industrial underdevelopment; for example, the required gas turbine power plants could neither be produced domestically nor imported at acceptable prices.

In April 2014, an image emerged of a full-scale mock-up of the Type 055 superstructure—with enclosed integrated mast for radar and other electronics—at the Chinese naval electronic testing range in Wuhan.

Nanchang, the first ship of the class, began construction in 2014 at the Jiangnan Shipyard in Shanghai, and was commissioned on 12 January 2020. Its first public appearance—preceding commissioning—was during the PLAN's 70th-anniversary parade on 23 April 2019. When launched, Nanchang was among the largest post-Second World War warships launched in East Asia.

Design

Stealth
The Type 055 adopts a conventional flared hull with distinctive stealthy features including an enclosed forecastle that hides mooring points, anchor chains, and other equipment. The bow and main deckhouse are configured similarly to previous Type 052C/D destroyers. A continuous structure amidship increases internal volume and reduces radar cross-section. The smokestack design reduces both infrared signature and radar cross-section. Chinese sources credit the design as being generally stealthy, with reduced radar, noise, infrared, and electromagnetic radiation signatures.

Power plants
Propulsive power is generated by four 28 MW QC-280 gas turbines in combined gas and gas arrangement. Additional power may be provided by six 5 MW QD-50 gas turbines.

The maximum speed is estimated to be 30 knots.

Electronics
Chinese literature suggests that the Type 055 is capable of "facilitat[ing] command management of a battlegroup and supporting elements". The command-and-control and battle management systems are likely comparable to contemporary PLAN systems, which reflect over a decade of intensive interest in information integration from the late 2000s.

The class has a dual-band radar system; four S-band Type 346B Dragon Eye active electronically scanned array (AESA) panels are mounted on the superstructure, and four smaller X-band panels are mounted on the mast. The Type 346B panels are estimated to be 40% larger than the Type 052D destroyer's Type 346A panels, for greater transmission power and sensitivity. Chinese sources claim the radar has anti-stealth capability and can be used to guide anti-satellite missiles.

A deployment port exists for variable depth and towed array sonar. The large bulbous bow likely contains a bow sonar; the Type 055 may mount a larger bow sonar than previous Chinese surface combatants.

Various electronic warfare support measures (ESM), electronic countermeasures (ECM), and electro-optic (EO) sensors and datalinks are mounted. They are likely more advanced than those deployed on previous ships.

Armament
The primary armament are missiles carried in 112-cell vertical launching system (VLS); 64 cells forward and 48 cells aft. The same VLS model is used on the Type 052D destroyer, which is believed to be an implementation of the GJB 5860-2006 standard; the GJB 5860-2006 is capable of hot and cold launches using concentric canisters. The longest variant, with 9-metre cells, is likely used. The Type 055 is expected to carry HHQ-9 surface-to-air missiles, YJ-18 anti-ship cruise missiles, CJ-10 land-attack cruise missiles, and missile-launched anti-submarine torpedoes upon entering service. Potentially, the larger cells may also carry anti-ship ballistic missiles.

Future developments
It has been suggested that future variants may be armed with lasers or electromagnetic railguns. Since the current design does not have integrated electric propulsion, installation of integrated electric propulsion will be required for the ship to meet power requirements in the future.

In 2021, United States Department of Defense identified Type 055 as the future launch platform for China's naval-based mid-course interceptors, such as the HQ-19 anti-ballistic missiles.

Ships of class

See also 
 List of active People's Liberation Army Navy ships

References

Citations

Sources 

 

Destroyer classes
Cruiser classes
Destroyers of the People's Liberation Army Navy